The 1983 Grote Prijs Jef Scherens was the 19th edition of the Grote Prijs Jef Scherens cycle race and was held on 18 September 1983. The race started and finished in Leuven. The race was won by Adri van der Poel.

General classification

References

1983
1983 in road cycling
1983 in Belgian sport